Hilderbrand is an unincorporated community in Monongalia County, West Virginia, United States.

References 

Unincorporated communities in West Virginia
Unincorporated communities in Monongalia County, West Virginia
Coal towns in West Virginia
West Virginia populated places on the Monongahela River